Rahy's Attorney (foaled in 2004 in Ontario) is a Canadian Thoroughbred Champion racehorse. A turf specialist, he is a Grade 1 winner and has won the Bunty Lawless Stakes on three occasions.

Trained by Ian Black, as at May 26, 2011 Rahy's Attorney has earned more than $2 million. In 2011, the seven-year-old gelding is still racing and won the March 26 Pan American Stakes at Gulfstream Park in Hallandale Beach, Florida.
He officially retired after a leg injury. He will recover in Ottawa.

References

 Rahy's Attorney's pedigree and partial racing stats

2004 racehorse births
Racehorses bred in Canada
Racehorses trained in Canada
Sovereign Award winners
Thoroughbred family 4-r